Methley is a village in the ward of Kippax and Methley in the metropolitan borough of the City of Leeds, West Yorkshire, England.  The village and surrounding area contain twelve listed buildings that are recorded in the National Heritage List for England.  Of these, one is listed at Grade I, the highest of the three grades, and the others are at Grade II, the lowest grade.  Most of the listed buildings are houses and associated structures, and the others include a church and memorials in the churchyard, a railway bridge, and a former school.


Key

Buildings

References

Citations

Sources

 

Lists of listed buildings in West Yorkshire